Hoffmann's two-toed sloth (Choloepus hoffmanni), also known as the northern two-toed sloth is a species of sloth from Central and South America.

It is a solitary, largely nocturnal and arboreal animal, found in mature and secondary rainforests and deciduous forests. The common name commemorates the German naturalist Karl Hoffmann.

Description

Hoffmann's two-toed sloth is a heavily built animal with shaggy fur and slow, deliberate movements. The fore feet have only two toes, each ending with long, curved claws, although three clawed toes are on each of the hind feet. Other features that distinguish it from three-toed sloths, which may be found in the same geographic areas, include the longer snout, separate rather than partially fused toes of the forefeet, the absence of hair on the soles of the feet, and larger overall size. The wrist of the sloth has developed some specific traits due to their slow, yet acrobatic motions.  These evolved traits include diminution and distal migration of the pisiform bone, with a loss of contact with the ulna; reduction of the distal end of the ulna to a styloid process; and extremely reduced contact between the ulna and triquetral bone.

Hoffmann's two-toed sloth is, however, much easier to confuse with the related Linnaeus's two-toed sloth, which it closely resembles. The primary physical differences between the two species relate to subtle skeletal features; for example, Hoffmann's two-toed sloth has three foramina in the upper forward part of the interpterygoid space, rather than just two, and often – but not always – has fewer cervical vertebrae.

Females are larger on average than males, although with considerable overlap in size. Their fur is tan to light brown in colour, being lighter on the face, but usually has a greenish tinge because of the presence of algae living in the hairs.

Its karyotype has 2n = 49–51 and FN = 61.

Distribution and habitat
It is found in the rainforest canopy in two separate regions of Central and South America, separated by the Andes. One population is found from eastern Honduras in the north to western Ecuador in the south, and the other in eastern Peru, western Brazil, and northern Bolivia. Based on cytochrome c oxidase subunit I sequences, a divergence date of about 7 million years between these populations has been suggested. Two-toed sloths live in the canopies in the forests of the tropical rainforests.  They usually tend to be relaxing in the branches of the trees that are intertwined within each other throughout the sheltering treetops.  Most of the two-toed sloths activity takes place hanging upside down but when it comes time for urination and defecation they make their way to the ground. These creatures also come to the ground when in need of a new tree to live upon or to discover a new food source.

Subspecies
The five recognised subspecies of C. hoffmanni are:
C. h. hoffmanni, Peters, 1858 – Honduras, Nicaragua, Costa Rica, Panama
C. h. agustinus, Allen, 1913 – Venezuela, western Colombia, northern Ecuador
C. h. capitalis, Allen, 1913 – western Ecuador
C. h. juruanus, Lönnberg, 1942 – Brazil, Bolivia, extreme eastern Peru
C. h. pallescens, Lönnberg, 1928 – Peru

Behavior

Two-toed sloths spend most of their time in trees, though they may travel on the ground to move to a new tree. A study of sloths on Barro Colorado Island indicated that the Hoffmann's two-toed sloths there were almost exclusively nocturnal, even though in other locations they are known to be active during day. The authors attributed this in part to competition with the brown-throated sloth. They often move slowly through the canopy for about eight hours each night, and spend much of the day sleeping in tangles of lianas. They are solitary in the wild, and, aside from mothers with young, it is unusual for two to be found in a tree at the same time.

The name "sloth" means "lazy", but the slow movements of this animal are actually an adaptation for surviving on a low-energy diet of leaves. These sloths have half the metabolic rate of a typical mammal of the same size. Sloths have very poor eyesight and hearing, and rely almost entirely on their senses of touch and smell to find food.

This species often exhibits exaggerated wobbling of the head. Another trait of this sloth is it often spits when the mouth opens. The saliva often accumulates on the lower lip, giving the creature a comical appearance.

Two-toed sloths hang from tree branches, suspended by their huge, hook-like claws. The clinging behaviour is a reflex action, and sloths are found still hanging from trees after they die. The sloth spends almost its entire life, including eating, sleeping, mating, and giving birth, hanging upside down from tree branches. Usually, sloths are found right side up when they descend to the ground to defecate, which they usually do about once every three to eight days.  They will also ground themselves to urinate, change trees if they wish, or mate, as well as give birth.  While terrestrial locomotion is usually thought to involve the sloth lying on the ground and pulling themselves forward, they have actually been seen walking on their palms and soles.

Sloths descend about once every eight days to defecate on the ground. The reason and mechanism behind this behavior have long been debated among scientists. There are at least five hypotheses: 1) fertilize trees when feces are deposited at the base of the tree; 2) cover feces and avoid predation; 3) chemical communication between individuals; 4) pick up trace nutrients in their claws, that are then ingested and 5) favor a mutualistic relationship with populations of fur moths. More recently, a new hypothesis has emerged, which presents evidence against the previous ones and proposes that all current sloths are descendants from species that defecated on the ground, and there simply has not been enough selective pressure to abandon this behavior, since cases of predation during defecation are actually very rare.

Sloths have many predators, including the jaguars, ocelots, harpy eagles, margays, and anacondas. If threatened, sloths can defend themselves by slashing out at a predator with their huge claws or biting with their sharp cheek teeth. However, a sloth's main defense is to avoid being attacked in the first place. The two-toed sloth can survive wounds that would be fatal to another mammal its size. The sloth's slow, deliberate movements and algae-covered fur make them difficult for predators to spot from a distance. Their treetop homes are also out of reach for many larger predators.

Their long, coarse fur also protects them from sun and rain. Their fur, unlike other mammals, flows from belly to top, not top to belly, allowing rainwater to slide off the fur while the animal is hanging upside down.

Hoffmann's two-toed sloth inhabits a range of different trees within its habitat, although it seems to prefer those with plentiful lianas and direct sunlight.

Life history

Courtship consists of the female licking the male's face and rubbing her genitals against the male's body. Gestation lasts between 355 and 377 days, and results in the birth of a single young.  The birth takes place on either the ground or in the hanging position. Newborn sloths weigh , and are precocial, already possessing long claws and able to cling to their mothers' undersides. They begin to take solid food at 15 to 27 days, and are fully weaned by 9 weeks. Although relatively quiet as adults, young sloths make loud bleating alarm calls if separated from their mothers.

In captivity, the two-toed sloth was seen giving birth by hanging upside down and attempting to pull the infant between her hind limbs and onto her abdomen.  Other sloths were seen hanging under the mother and infant to protect the infant from falling.

Hoffmann's two-toed sloths reach sexual maturity at two to four years of age and have been reported to live up to 43 years in captivity.

Diet

Though two-toed sloths also eat fruits and flowers, most of their diets consist of tree leaves.  They use their lips to tear off their food and chew with their peg-like teeth which have no enamel and are always growing. Although they are not true ruminants, sloths have three-chambered stomachs. The first two chambers hold symbiotic bacteria to help them digest the cellulose in their fibre-rich diets, while only the third chamber contains digestive glands typical of the stomachs of most other mammals. A sloth may take up to a month to completely digest a meal, and up to two-thirds of a sloth's weight may be the leaves in its digestive system.

Conservation status
Habitat destruction is probably causing a decrease in the wild Hoffmann's two-toed sloth population, but little reliable data is available on the number of wild individuals. Sloths and people have little contact with one another in the wild.

Reproduction 
The reproduction process of the two-toed sloths has some differences when compared to the three-toed sloths. Two toed sloths tend to mate all year around; they don’t really go by a schedule. If they had to pick the most popular season to mate it would be during rainy seasons and give birth in the dry seasons. The female carries the baby for typically 11.5 months. Sloths don't tend to have one life long breeding partner. When the females are ready to mate, they let out a loud scream which attracts the males; if numerous males are ready to mate, they fight each other; after done mating, the male will usually leave. One factor that might explain this difference is that in some places, female sloths congregate around small, heterogeneously distributed habitats, allowing dominant males to gain mating access with multiple females with relatively little risk and effort. The female is the one who solely takes care of the baby sloth until they are independent and don’t need the mother anymore. For the first 6–9 months of birth, mother sloth is carrying the baby and nurturing it until they are capable of being on their own. Sloths are sexually matured by the age 3 and are ready to start reproducing of their own.

Adaptation 
Sloths are known to be heterothermic, meaning that whatever environment they’re in, they learn to adapt.  Their body temperature ranges from 86-93 degrees Fahrenheit (about 30 to 34 degrees Celsius), which, compared to other mammals is on the cold side.  Having these low temperatures helps the sloths conserve their energy. Sloths' fur is grown specifically for a job which is to grow algae.  The algae grow within their hair shaft and benefits the creatures' camouflaging techniques. The hair grows in a special system of being parted along the stomach and flows from belly to back. This system is helpful for when the sloths are hanging upside down and the rainwater can run off.

References

Further reading

External links

 View the sloth genome in Ensembl
 

Sloths
Mammals of Bolivia
Mammals of Brazil
Mammals of Colombia
Mammals of Central America
Mammals of Ecuador
Mammals of Peru
Mammals of Venezuela
Mammals of the Andes
Mammals described in 1858
Taxa named by Wilhelm Peters
Articles containing video clips